Chaboillez is a French-Canadian surname. It may refer to:

People
Augustin Chaboillez, Canadian priest of Co-Cathedral of Saint-Antoine-de-Padoue (Montreal), 1806–1834
Charles Chaboillez (1736–1808), French Canadian fur trader
Louis Chaboillez (1766–1813), notary and politician in Lower Canada
Marie-Marguerite Chaboillez (born 1775), daughter of Charles Chaboillez and wife of Simon McTavish

Other uses
Chaboillez River, a river of Quebec
Chaboillez Square, a town square in Montreal, Canada